Pete Palmer (born January 30, 1938) is an American sports statistician and encyclopedia editor.  He is a major contributor to the applied mathematical field referred to as sabermetrics.  Along with the Bill James Baseball Abstracts, Palmer's book The Hidden Game of Baseball is often referred to as providing the foundation upon which the field of sabermetrics was built.

Baseball work
Palmer began his career as a baseball analyst when he worked for the Raytheon Corporation as a radar systems engineer.  At night, after his co-workers had left for the day, Palmer used the company's (at the time) cutting-edge computers to run advanced simulations analyzing historical baseball statistics.  In 1982, he gained notoriety when he recognized a scorekeeper's error which counted a 1910 Detroit Tigers box score twice, crediting Ty Cobb with an extra two hits and three at-bats.  That year Cobb was declared the batting champion, despite an unsuccessful effort by the St. Louis Browns to help Cleveland Naps star Nap Lajoie overtake Cobb.  If the double-counted game were to be removed Cobb's average would finish second to Lajoie, though Major League Baseball still lists Cobb as the batting average leader.  Palmer also innovated the Linear Weights method of estimating a player's offensive contributions, an invention that will likely be his lasting legacy.  Palmer, with help from Dick Cramer, invented OPS (on-base plus slugging) in 1978, which now is universally accepted as a measure of approximating batting ability.

Many of Palmer's early works were written in partnership with John Thorn, including The Hidden Game of Baseball and Total Baseball; the latter book also featured, in later editions, the contributions of editor Michael Gershman.  Palmer edited or served as a consultant for many of the sports reference books produced by Total Sports Publishing.  Palmer's most recent work has been in collaboration with Gary Gillette.  Since 2003, the pair has produced five editions of the ESPN Baseball Encyclopedia, and several other baseball annuals.  In 2010 he was named a charter member of the Henry Chadwick Society by SABR (Society for American Baseball Research) and also received a lifetime achievement award from them in 2018.

Football work
Palmer has also played a significant role in the field of football statistics.  In the seventies, he served as editor for several editions of the A.S. Barnes football encyclopedia.  In 1973, he joined the stat crew of the New England Patriots, compiling the official statistics for the team's home games.  Palmer continued this task through the 2016 season.

In 1988, Palmer published The Hidden Game of Football, with co-authors Thorn and Bob Carroll.  The book was updated and re-released in 1998 and is still considered the seminal work on football analysis. He was also co-editor (with Gillette, Sean Lahman, et al.) of the ESPN Pro Football Encyclopedia.

Personal life
Palmer has three children. Emily, the oldest, Stephen, the youngest, and Daniel. He resides in Hollis, New Hampshire.

See also

References

External links 
 Henry Chadwick Award: Pete Palmer by David W. Smith (2010)
 

1938 births
Living people
American sportswriters
Baseball statisticians
Place of birth missing (living people)